Alexander Andreevich Yakovlev (born July 18, 1984), is a Russian  mixed martial artist and rapper who competes in the Lightweight division. Yakovlev competed in the Ultimate Fighting Championship, M-1 Global, ProFC, Shooto Russia, and Bodog Fight promotions.

Mixed martial arts career

M-Global
At the age of 19, Alexander made his professional MMA debut in a tournament for M-1 Global. 

Yakovlev faced Shamil Zavurov on March 16, 2012 at M-1 Challenge 31, with the fight ending in a draw (judges scorecards: 29–28 Zavurov, 28–28, 28–28)

Yakovlev faced Rashid Magomedov on November 15, 2012 at M-1 Challenge 35. He lost the fight via unanimous decision.

Yakovlev faced Murad Abdulaev on April 9, 2013 at M-1 Challenge 38. He won via split decision.

Yakovlev faced UFC veteran Paul Daley on November 8, 2013 at Legend 2. He won via unanimous decision.

Ultimate Fighting Championship
On January 6, 2014, Yakovlev signed a contract with the UFC.

Yakovlev was initially expected to make his debut against Yan Cabral on May 10, 2014 at UFC Fight Night 40. However, on April 9, Yakovlev was moved to The Ultimate Fighter Brazil 3 Finale card as he replaced an injured Mike Pierce against Demian Maia. He lost the fight via unanimous decision.

Yakovlev fought Nico Musoke on October 4, 2014 at UFC Fight Night 53. He lost the fight via unanimous decision.

Yakovlev next dropped to the lightweight division and faced Gray Maynard on April 4, 2015 at UFC Fight Night 63. He won the fight by unanimous decision.

Yakovlev faced George Sullivan in the Welterweight at UFC on Fox 18 on January 30, 2016. He won the fight via knockout in the first round.

Yakovlev was expected to face Ryan LaFlare on July 23, 2016 at UFC on Fox 20. However, LaFlare pulled out of the fight in early June after sustaining an undisclosed injury and replaced by Kamaru Usman. He lost the one-sided fight via unanimous decision.

Yakovlev faced Zak Cummings at UFC Fight Night 99 on November 19, 2016.  He lost the fight by submission due to armbar in the second round.

Yakovlev was expected to return from an extended hiatus to face Teemu Packalén on April 20, 2019 at UFC Fight Night 149.  However on April 4, 2019 it was reported that Packalen pull out for undisclosed reason and he was replaced by Alex da Silva Coelho. Yakovlev won the fight via guillotine choke submission in the second round.

Yakovlev was scheduled to face Vinc Pichel on November 9, 2019 at UFC Fight Night 163 However, Pichel pulled out of the fight on October 24 citing an undisclosed injury and was replaced by Roosevelt Roberts. He lost the fight via unanimous decision.

Yakovlev faced Joel Álvarez on October 24, 2020 at UFC 254. At the weigh-ins, Álvarez weighed in at 159.5 pounds, three and a half pounds over the lightweight non-title fight limit. The bout proceeded at catchweight and Álvarez was fined 30% of his purse respectively, which went to Yakovlev. Yakovlev lost the fight via an armbar submission in the first round.

On June 17, 2021, it was announced that Yakovlev was released from the UFC.

Post UFC 
In his first appearance after leaving the UFC, he faced Ali Abdulkhalikov on March 27, 2022 at ProFC 70. He lost the bout via unanimous decision.

Championships and accomplishments

Sambo
Russian Combat Sambo Federation
Medalist Russian Sambo Championship

Hand-to-hand combat
Russian Union of Martial Arts
Medalist Russian Hand-to-hand combat Championships
Russian National Champion

Freestyle Wrestling
All-Russian Wrestling Federation
Medalist of Freestyle Wrestling National Tournament

Grappling
NAGA
World Champion (2014, 187 lbs)

Mixed martial arts record 

|-
|
|align=center|
|Maxim Butorin
|
|AMC Fight Nights 119
|
|align=center|
|align=center|
|Ulyanovsk, Russia
|
|-
|Loss
|align=center|
|Ali Abdulkhalikov
|Decision (unanimous)
|ProFC 70
|
|align=center|5
|align=center|5:00
|Rostov-on-Don, Russia
|
|-
|Loss
|align=center|25–11–1
|Joel Álvarez
|Submission (armbar)
|UFC 254
|
|align=center|1
|align=center|3:00
|Abu Dhabi, United Arab Emirates
|
|-
|Loss
|align=center|25–10–1
|Roosevelt Roberts
|Decision (unanimous)
|UFC Fight Night: Magomedsharipov vs. Kattar 
|
|align=center|3
|align=center|5:00
|Moscow, Russia
|  
|-
|Win
|align=center|25–9–1
|Alex da Silva Coelho
|Submission (guillotine choke)
|UFC Fight Night: Overeem vs. Oleinik 
|
|align=center|2
|align=center|3:10
|Saint Petersburg, Russia
|
|-
|Loss
|align=center|24–9–1 
|Zak Cummings
|Submission (straight armbar)
|UFC Fight Night: Mousasi vs. Hall 2
|
|align=center| 2
|align=center| 3:25
|Belfast, Northern Ireland
|
|-
|Loss
|align=center|24–8–1
|Kamaru Usman
|Decision (unanimous)
|UFC on Fox: Holm vs. Shevchenko 
|
|align=center|3
|align=center|5:00
|Chicago, Illinois, United States
|
|-
|Win
|align=center|24–7–1
|George Sullivan
|KO (punches)
|UFC on Fox: Johnson vs. Bader
|
|align=center|1
|align=center|3:59
|Newark, New Jersey, United States
|
|-
| Win
| align=center| 23–7–1
| Gray Maynard
| Decision (unanimous)
| UFC Fight Night: Mendes vs. Lamas
| 
|align=center|3
|align=center|5:00
|Fairfax, Virginia, United States
|
|-
| Loss
| align=center| 22–7–1
| Nico Musoke
| Decision (unanimous)
| UFC Fight Night: Nelson vs. Story
| 
| align=center| 3
| align=center| 5:00
| Stockholm, Sweden
| 
|-
| Loss
| align=center| 22–6–1
| Demian Maia
| Decision (unanimous)
| The Ultimate Fighter Brazil 3 Finale: Miocic vs. Maldonado
| 
| align=center| 3
| align=center| 5:00
| São Paulo, Brazil
| 
|-
| Win
| align=center| 22–5–1
| Paul Daley
| Decision (unanimous)
| Legend: Part 2: Invasion
| 
| align=center| 3
| align=center| 5:00
| Moscow, Russia
| 
|-
| Win
| align=center| 21–5–1
| Reinaldo da Silva
| Decision (unanimous)
| Fightspirit Championship 1
| 
| align=center| 2
| align=center| 5:00
| Kolpino, Russia
| 
|-
| Win
| align=center| 20–5–1
| Murad Abdulaev
| Decision (split)
| M-1 Challenge 38
| 
| align=center| 3
| align=center| 5:00
| Saint Petersburg, Russia
| 
|-
| Loss
| align=center| 19–5–1
| Rashid Magomedov
| Decision (unanimous)
| M-1 Challenge 35
| 
| align=center| 5
| align=center| 5:00
| Saint Petersburg, Russia
|
|-
| Draw
| align=center| 19–4–1
| Shamil Zavurov
| Draw (majority)
| M-1 Challenge 31
| 
| align=center| 3
| align=center| 5:00
| Saint Petersburg, Russia
| 
|-
| Win
| align=center| 19–4
| Juan Manuel Suarez
| TKO (punches)
| M-1 Global: Fedor vs. Monson
| 
| align=center| 2
| align=center| 3:55
| Moscow, Russia
| 
|-
| Win
| align=center| 18–4
| Christian Eckerlin
| Submission (rear-naked choke)
| M-1 Challenge 25: Zavurov vs. Enomoto
| 
| align=center| 2
| align=center| 3:14
| Saint Petersburg, Russia
| 
|-
| Win
| align=center| 17–4
| Dimitri Anghelou
| Submission (rear-naked choke)
| IM 1: Team Saint Petersburg vs. Team France
| 
| align=center| 2
| align=center| 3:40
| Cherepovets, Russia
| 
|-
| Win
| align=center| 16–4
| Khamid Gereyhanov
| Submission (rear-naked choke)
| Draka: Governor's Cup 2010
| 
| align=center| 1
| align=center| N/A
| Khabarovsk, Russia
|Return to Welterweight.
|-
| Win
| align=center| 15–4
| Vahe Tadevosyan
| Submission (triangle choke)
| ProFC: Union Nation Cup 7
| 
| align=center| 1
| align=center| 4:55
| Rostov-on-Don, Russia
|
|-
| Loss
| align=center| 14–4
| Jacob McClintock
| Submission (armbar)
| fightFORCE: Day of Anger
| 
| align=center| 1
| align=center| 4:59
| Saint Petersburg, Russia
|
|-
| Win
| align=center| 14–3
| Yuri Pulaev
| Submission (rear-naked choke)
| Shooto Russia: Against The War
| 
| align=center| 1
| align=center| 3:00
| Saint Petersburg, Russia
|
|-
| Win
| align=center| 13–3
| Alexander Kokoev
| Submission (rear-naked choke)
| Bodog Fight: USA vs. Russia
| 
| align=center| 2
| align=center| 4:43
| Moscow, Russia
|
|-
| Win
| align=center| 12–3
| Gigam Matevosian
| Decision (unanimous)
| PGM: Russia vs. Novgorod
| 
| align=center| 2
| align=center| 5:00
| Velikiy Novgorod, Russia
|Light Heavyweight bout.
|-
| Win
| align=center| 11–3
| Gigam Matevosian
| Submission (triangle choke)
| PGM: Russia vs. Novgorod
| 
| align=center| 2
| align=center| 2:15
| Velikiy Novgorod, Russia
|Light Heavyweight bout.
|-
| Loss
| align=center| 10–3
| Karl Amoussou
| Submission (armbar)
| M-1 MFC: International Mix Fight
| 
| align=center| 1
| align=center| 1:44
| Saint Petersburg, Russia
| 
|-
| Win
| align=center| 10–2
| Ishkhan Zakharian
| TKO (punches)
| M-1: International Fight Night 6
| 
| align=center| 1
| align=center| 3:26
| Saint Petersburg, Russia
| 
|-
| Win
| align=center| 9–2
| Andrei Simykin
| TKO (punches)
| M-1: Mix-Fight Tournament
| 
| align=center| 3
| align=center| 1:40
| Saint Petersburg, Russia
|
|-
| Win
| align=center| 8–2
| Alexander Grebenkin
| TKO (punches)
| M-1 MFC: Mix-fight
| 
| align=center| 1
| align=center| N/A
| Saint Petersburg, Russia
|
|-
| Win
| align=center| 7–2
| Oleg Glazunov
| KO (punches)
| M-1 MFC: New Blood
| 
| align=center| 2
| align=center| 1:40
| Saint Petersburg, Russia
| 
|-
| Win
| align=center| 6–2
| Danila Veselov
| Decision (unanimous)
| M-1 MFC: Mix-fight
| 
| align=center| 2
| align=center| 5:00
| Saint Petersburg, Russia
| 
|-
| Win
| align=center| 5–2
| Artur Korchemny
| TKO (punches)
| CF: Champions Fight
| 
| align=center| 1
| align=center| 3:20
| Saint Petersburg, Russia
| 
|-
| Win
| align=center| 4–2
| Dmitry Sokov
| TKO (punches)
| M-1 MFC: International Fight Nights
| 
| align=center| 1
| align=center| 1:32
| Saint Petersburg, Russia
| 
|-
| Loss
| align=center| 3–2
| Magomed Tugayev
| Submission (armbar)
| M-1 MFC: Mix-Fight
| 
| align=center| N/A
| align=center| N/A
| Saint Petersburg, Russia
| 
|-
| Win
| align=center| 3–1
| Vladimir Magomedshayshafiev
| Submission (rear-naked choke)
| M-1 MFC: Mix-Fight
| 
| align=center| N/A
| align=center| N/A
| Saint Petersburg, Russia
| 
|-
| Win
| align=center| 2–1
| Vladimir Magomedshayshafiev
| TKO (punches)
| M-1 MFC: Mix-Fight
| 
| align=center| N/A
| align=center| N/A
| Saint Petersburg, Russia
|
|-
| Loss
| align=center| 1–1
| Alexander Shlemenko
| TKO (punches)
| rowspan=2|IAFC: Stage of Russia Cup 3
| rowspan=2| 
| align=center| 2
| align=center| N/A
| rowspan=2|Omsk, Russia
| 
|-
| Win
| align=center| 1–0
| Dmitry Iliyicin
| Decision (unanimous) 
| align=center| 2
| align=center| 5:00
| 
|-

Discography
Examen (Exam) (2011)
Bad Boy with D.Masta (2011)
''Money Power (2012)

See also
 List of male mixed martial artists

References

External links
 
 

Living people
Welterweight mixed martial artists
Russian male mixed martial artists
1984 births
People from Veliky Novgorod
Russian expatriates in the United States
Russian rappers
Russian sambo practitioners
Ultimate Fighting Championship male fighters
Sportspeople from Novgorod Oblast
Mixed martial artists utilizing ARB
Mixed martial artists utilizing sambo
Mixed martial artists utilizing freestyle wrestling